Central Park is an urban park in Manhattan, New York City. Central Park is the most visited urban park in the United States, with 40 million visitors in 2013, and one of the most filmed locations in the world. A landmark of New York City since 1857, it has been featured in numerous films, TV shows, songs, video games, books, photographs, and artwork.

Painting 

 William Merritt Chase painted a portrait of Central Park in 1889.
 Pierre Alechinsky represented the Mall in Central Park in a 1965 acrylic painting.
 Maurice Prendergast represented Central Park in several paintings.

Photography 
 Elliott Erwitt took photographs of dogs in Central Park in 1974.
Bruce Davidson's photobook Central Park (1995) was a four-year exploration of the park.
Tod Papageorge chronicled the park over several decades for his photobook Passing Through Eden (2007).

Literature 
 In 1967, the Canadian poet Leonard Cohen sang in public in Central Park in the company of Judy Collins.
 The writer Evan H Rhodes published The Prince of Central Park, a 1975 novel that describes the life of an 11-year-old in the park.
 In the book The Catcher in the Rye, the main character, Holden Caulfield, often wonders what happens to the ducks and fish in Central Park when the ice begins to form in winter. He also spends time in the park in parts of the novel.

Films and TV 
Central Park, as a universal symbol of the city, appeared and continues to appear in numerous film productions, as well as in numerous television series. Among its most famous appearances:
 The first film to feature Central Park was Romeo and Juliet, in 1908. Since then there have been at least 305 films which feature Central Park, making it the most filmed location for films. Many Academy Award winning films feature a scene in the park.
 In 1960, early in the Academy Award-winning film The Apartment, Bud is seen sleeping on the park benches after being denied access to the apartment.
 In 1970, the protagonists of the film The Out-of-Towners sleep in (and get mugged in) Central Park.
 In 1970, the climactic final scene of the romantic comedy The Owl and the Pussycat occurs in Central Park on Cedar Hill.
 In 1970, a character gets repeatedly mugged while running across Central Park at night in the comedy Where's Poppa?.
 In 1976, the John Schlesinger film Marathon Man shows the hero training in Central Park.
 In 1979, Central Park is the place where main characters of Hair meet for the first time.
 In 1980, in the Italian horror film Inferno one character gets killed at a pond in Central Park.
 In 1984, the film Ghostbusters has Rick Moranis in the part of Louis Tully running through Central Park, while being chased by a Terror Dog.
 In 1986, the film The Park Is Mine features Tommy Lee Jones, in the role of a Vietnam veteran, who takes the park hostage. The film is based on the novel Central Park by Stephen Peters.
 in 1991 the film The Fisher King has scenes of Central Park.
 In 1992, the film Home Alone 2: Lost in New York has some scenes in Central Park.
 In 1993, in the animated film We're Back! A Dinosaur's Story, the dinosaurs find themselves in Central Park.
 In 1994, the miniseries The Stand depicts the park as part of an abandoned city in the wake of a world-ending plague.
 In 1994, in the animated film A Troll in Central Park, the titular troll is banished to Central Park.
 In 1994, in the TV special "We Wish You a Turtle Christmas," the Teenage Mutant Ninja Turtles sing a number at Bethesda Terrace and Fountain.
 In 1995, Die Hard with a Vengeance  by John McTiernan had Bruce Willis driving a taxi through Central Park.
 In 1995, in the animated film Balto, there are live-action sequences at the beginning and end of an elderly woman and her granddaughter visiting the Balto sculpture in Central Park.
 In 1996, the film I'm Not Rappaport by Herb Gardner has most of the scenes in Central Park.
 In 1996, James and the Giant Peach by Henry Selick, James and his friends insects settle in the Giant Peach in Central Park.
 In 1998, Antz,The First film from Dreamworks Animation is revealed to take place in Central Park
 In 1999, Stuart Little, an American family comedy film directed by Rob Minkoff with Geena Davis and Hugh Laurie.
 In 2001, The Amazing Race 1 started its competition at Bethesda Fountain.
 In 2002, Maid in Manhattan by Wayne Wang with Jennifer Lopez and Ralph Fiennes.
 In 2002, Prince of Central Park was released.
 In 2002 in The Time Machine, the hero offers her engagement ring in Central Park.
 In 2003, in Elf has many scenes that take place in Central Park.
 In 2005, 2008, and 2012, in the animated film  Madagascar and its two sequels, the protagonists live in the Central Park Zoo.
 In 2005, the film Little Manhattan by Mark Levin has some scenes in Central Park.
 in 2007, in the film August Rush, Evan played by Freddie Highmore performs his last concert in Central Park
 In 2007, in the animated film  Bee Movie are scenes of Central Park.
 In 2007, in the film Enchanted, the musical number "That's How You Know" takes places in several parts of Central Park.
 In 2008, in the film Cloverfield, the last part of the film takes place in Central Park, where Rob and Beth take shelter under the Greyshot Arch, just before "Hammer Down Protocol" wipes down the island of Manhattan.
 In 2008, Central Park is ground zero for the epidemic in The Happening
In 2011, in the thriller film Limitless with Bradley Cooper, Robert De Niro and Abbie Cornish, multiple shots show Cornish's character running through Central Park.
 In 2011, in live-action/animated film The Smurfs some final conflict scenes between the Smurfs and Gargamel occur in Central Park.
 In 2011, in the last episode of Glee.
 In 2012,  The Avengers, one of the last scenes happens in Central Park.
 In 2012, the Doctor Who seventh series episode "The Angels Take Manhattan" features several scenes in Central Park.
 In 2015,  Love Live! The School Idol Movie features several locations within Central Park.
 In 2016,  Fantastic Beasts and Where to Find Them, Newt Scamander and Jacob Kawolski track one of Newt's animals to the Central Park Zoo, and then chase it through Central Park, trying to recapture it.
 In 2017, John Wick: Chapter 2, in the last scene John Wick and his dog run through the park. 
 In the series Sex and the City, several scenes take place in Central Park.
 In the series Gossip Girl, which takes place in the Upper East Side, multiple scenes take place in Central Park.
 The TV series Central Park West was set on Central Park West and several scenes take place in Central Park.
 Various episodes of Law & Order, Law & Order: Special Victims Unit, and Law & Order: Criminal Intent feature scenes in the park.
The Disney series Jessie feature scenes in Central Park.
In one episode of Liv and Maddie, Liv is attending a Halloween event in Central Park (season 3).
 The animated Apple TV+ series Central Park mainly takes place in the park.

Music 
 Numerous concerts have been hosted in the park, mentioned above.
 Central Park in the Dark, composed in 1906, is one of the most famous works of American composer Charles Ives.
 The first album by Nina Simone, Little Girl Blue, has a song titled Central Park Blues.
 A John Coltrane song is called "Central Park West".
Steve Hunter released a blues guitar instrumental titled "Sunset in Central Park" on his 2013 CD The Manhattan Blues Project

Videogames 
 In the 1988 videogame Last Ninja 2, level 1 is in Central Park.
 In the 1998 videogame Parasite Eve, Central Park is one of the locations in Manhattan that the player must visit.
 In the 2001 videogame Spider-Man 2: The Sinister Six, Central Park is one of the levels.
 In the 2008 videogame Alone in the Dark, most of its action takes place in Central Park.
 In the 2008 videogame Grand Theft Auto IV and its 2009 sequel Grand Theft Auto: Chinatown Wars, the park appears in Liberty City as Middle Park.
 In the 2009 Ghostbusters: The Video Game, the last level, which features the mausoleum of Ivo Shandor, takes place in Central Park.
 In the 2016 videogame Tom Clancy's The Division, Central Park is nearby the Dark Zone.
 In the 2018 videogame Marvel’s Spider-Man, an in-game depiction appears in the same position as its real world counterpart.

References 

Popular culture
New York City in popular culture